Paul Hornsby is an American musician and record producer who has produced gold and platinum records for artists including the Charlie Daniels Band, The Marshall Tucker Band, and Wet Willie.

Overview
Paul Hornsby started playing music at an early age. His first professional experience came in 1962 in the band the 5 Men-its. By 1967, he was playing with Duane and Gregg Allman in the Hour Glass. After that time, Hornsby began a producing career, first with Capricorn Records, then as an independent. He has produced albums by such artists as Charlie Daniels, the Marshall Tucker Band, and Wet Willie. He has also performed with Elvin Bishop, Captain Beyond, Gerry Goffin, and Livingston Taylor. He owns his own recording studio and still has his own band, Coupe De Ville.

Singles Hornsby has produced include "The South's Gonna Do It Again", "Long Haired Country Boy", "Heard It in a Love Song", and "Fire On The Mountain".

Musical contributions
Paul Hornsby has performed with:
 The 5 Minutes
 The Men-its
 Hour Glass
 Gregg Allman
 Elvin Bishop
 Captain Beyond
 Gerry Goffin
 Livingston Taylor
 Grinderswitch
 Marshall Tucker Band
 Alex Taylor on 'Alex Taylor with friends and neighbours' and 'Dinnertime' (both on Capricorn Records).

Sugar Creek Band

References

Relevant literature
Hornsby, Paul. 2021. Fix it in the mix: A memoir. Macon, GA: Mercer University Press.

External links
Paul Hornsby official website
Extensive interview with Paul Hornsby, January 2001, swampland.com
Interview with Paul Hornsby  SweetHomeMusic.fr & bands Of Dixie (2004)

Record producers from Alabama
Musicians from Alabama
Place of birth missing (living people)
Year of birth missing (living people)
Living people